O Kang-Chol or O Khang-Chol (born 16 September 1993) is a North Korean weightlifter and Asian Games Champion competing in the 69 kg category until 2018 and 73 kg starting in 2018 after the International Weightlifting Federation reorganized the categories.

Career
He competed at the 69 kg class at the 2018 Asian Games and won a gold medal in that event. Later in 2018 he competed in the newly created 73 kg weight class and finished fifth overall at the 2018 World Weightlifting Championships

Major results

References

External links

Living people
North Korean male weightlifters
Olympic weightlifters of North Korea
Asian Games medalists in weightlifting
Asian Games gold medalists for North Korea
Weightlifters at the 2018 Asian Games
Medalists at the 2018 Asian Games
1993 births
World Weightlifting Championships medalists
21st-century North Korean people